David O'Gorman (born 20 June 1972) is an English former footballer, who played as a winger. He made appearances in the English football league for Welsh club Swansea City.

Career
O'Gorman's first club was Wrexham, where he spent 17 months at as a professional after rising through the youth team before moving to Northwich Victoria.

He would then move between various clubs in the English and Welsh leagues, winning the League of Wales with Barry Town United in the 1996–97 season before being signed by Football League Third Division club Swansea City, for who he made 39 league appearances.

In his later career, he would have a spell at South African club Hellenic before returning to the U.K. to end his career at Rhyl.

Honours

Barry Town United
League Of Wales: 1996–97

References

Living people
English Football League players
Cymru Premier players
Expatriate soccer players in South Africa
Wrexham A.F.C. players
Northwich Victoria F.C. players
Hyde United F.C. players
Connah's Quay Nomads F.C. players
Barry Town United F.C. players
Swansea City A.F.C. players
Hellenic F.C. players
Rhyl F.C. players
1972 births
Association football wingers
English footballers